The National Museum of Flight is Scotland's national aviation museum, at East Fortune Airfield, just south of the village of East Fortune, Scotland. It is one of the museums within National Museums Scotland. The museum is housed in the original wartime buildings of RAF East Fortune which is a well preserved World War II airfield. As a result of this the entire site is a scheduled monument with no permanent structures added by the museum. The hangars, control tower and stores were designated as Category B listed buildings by Historic Scotland, but this designation was removed in 2013 as they were already covered by the stricter scheduling.

Museum history

The collections date back to 1909 when the Royal Scottish Museum acquired Percy Pilcher's Hawk glider. This was the first aircraft collected by any museum in the United Kingdom. The same year the museum acquired models of the Wright Model A and Blériot XI. During the early 1920s several aero engines were added to the collection, including a 1910 33 hp Wright engine donated by Orville Wright. In 1968 a Slingsby Gull sailplane was acquired. In 1971 the museum was given a Supermarine Spitfire XVI by the Ministry of Defence. This could not be displayed in Edinburgh and was stored in a hangar at East Fortune. The following year a Hawker Sea Hawk, de Havilland Sea Vampire and de Havilland Sea Venom were received from RNAS Lossiemouth. The growth in the aircraft collection led to the decision to open a Museum of Flight at East Fortune, with the public admitted for the first time on 7 July 1975. The displays included several aircraft on loan, including de Havilland Dragon Rapide (G-ADAH), BA Swallow (G-AEVZ) and Fairey Delta 2 WG774. In 1979 a temporary exhibition about the R34 airship was mounted, followed by Fighters of the RFC and RAF, 1914 to 1940 the following year. The 1981 temporary exhibition was The Flight of Rudolf Hess 1941.

The museum expanded significantly in 1981 as a result of the sale by auction of much of the Strathallan Collection of aircraft. The museum purchased five aircraft (Bristol Fairchild Bolingbroke, de Havilland Dragon, de Havilland Puss Moth, General Aircraft Cygnet and Percival Provost). Of these, the Cygnet and Provost were the first aircraft to make their final flights to join the museum. That same year, the de Havilland Comet also flew in to the museum, as did the Avro Vulcan in 1984. Another significant expansion took place with the donation of much of the British Airways Collection of aircraft in 2006. This collection was previously displayed at the Royal Air Force Museum Cosford. The museum acquired the BAC 1-11, Vickers Viscount, Boeing 707 forward fuselage and Hawker Siddeley Trident cockpit. Visitors are able to walk through the 1-11 and 707 and look into the flight deck of the Trident. This is in addition to walking through the de Havilland Comet and Jetstream 31 fuselage which were already in the museum collections.

A £3.6million project, completed in 2016, installed heating and insulation for the first time to two hangars that were built in 1940.

Collections

The museum collections have expanded into one of the most important in the UK, covering all aspects of aviation including military, civil and recreational. The museum is significant in that it is the only UK national museum still collecting the history of commercial aviation. This resulted in the museum putting their Boeing 707 fuselage section on display from April 2010, with a collection of BOAC crew and passenger artefacts, including a 1960s stewardess uniform.

A list of the aircraft in the collection is given on the museum website. The aircraft on display are:

 Aero S-103 (613677), Czechoslovakian licence-built version of the MiG-15
 Aérospatiale-BAC Concorde G-BOAA. This is displayed as "Scotland's Concorde" and is the focus of "The Concorde Experience" which opened on 16 March 2005
 Airwave Magic Kiss hang-glider
 Armstrong Whitworth Meteor NF.14 (G-ARCX), operated by the Ferranti Flying Unit at Edinburgh Airport
 Avro Anson C.19 (G-APHV)
 Avro Vulcan B.2A (XM597) which carried out two of the Operation Black Buck missions during the Falklands War

 BAC 1-11 (G-AVMO) in British Airways livery
 Beagle Terrier (G-ARSL)
 Beech 18 (G-ASUG), in Loganair livery
 Boeing 707 (G-APFJ) forward fuselage in BOAC livery, the centrepiece of "The Jet Age" exhibition
 Bristol Beaufighter TF.X (RD220), under restoration
 Bristol Fairchild Bolingbroke (9940)
 British Aerospace Jetstream 31 (G-JSSD)
 Britten-Norman Islander (G-BELF)
 de Havilland Comet 4C (G-BDIX) in Dan-Air livery
 de Havilland Dove (G-ANOV) in Civil Aviation Authority Flying Unit livery.
 de Havilland Dragon (VH-SNB)
 de Havilland Puss Moth (VH-UQB)
 de Havilland Sea Venom (WW145)
 de Havilland Tiger Moth (G-AOEL)
 Druine Turbulent (G-AVPC)
 English Electric Canberra (VX185) forward fuselage
 English Electric Lightning F.2A (XN776)
 Ferranti Phoenix UAV
 Firebird Sierra hang-glider

 General Aircraft Cygnet (G-AGBN), flown twice by Guy Gibson, leader of the Dambusters Raid
 Hawker Siddeley Harrier (XV277), the oldest surviving Harrier
 Hawker Siddeley Trident 1C (G-ARPH) cockpit section
 Hawker Sea Hawk (WF259)
 Ikarus C42 G-SJEN
 Messerschmitt Me 163 Komet rocket fighter (191659), the fastest aircraft of World War II
 Miles M.18 (G-AHKY)
 Montgomerie-Parsons two-seat autogyro (G-UNIV)
 Panavia Tornado F.3 (ZE934)
 Piper Comanche G-ATOY Myth Too, flown round the world twice by Sheila Scott
 Schleicher Ka-4 Rhönlerche II (GA 591)
 Scot-Kites Cirrus III hang-glider
 Scottish Aviation Twin Pioneer (G-BBVF)
 SEPECAT Jaguar (XZ119) Katrina Jane
 Slingsby Grasshopper (XA228)
 Spartan Cruiser III (G-ACYK) forward fuselage
 Supermarine Spitfire XVI (TE462)
 Vickers Viscount (G-AMOG), in British European Airways livery
 Weir W-2 autogyro

In addition the museum has a large collection of hang-gliders, microlights and sailplanes, but most of these are not currently on display.

The rest of the collections, only some of which are on display, include:
 a large number of aero engines (including piston engines, turboprops, turbojets and turbofans)
 aircraft parts (including S.E.5a wings and Sopwith Cuckoo wings)
 avionics (including radars built by Ferranti in Edinburgh, such as the AI.23 AIRPASS and AI.24 Foxhunter)
 uniforms (military and civil)
 medals and decorations
 weapons (including bombs, missiles and cannons)
 models
 ephemera
 photographs
 documents

Displays

Hangar 1: Conservation
This hangar is not open to visitors.

Hangar 2: Military Aviation
Aircraft on display include the Spitfire, Bolingbroke, Meteor, Tornado and Jaguar, as well as the Messerschmitt Me 163 Komet flown by Captain Eric Brown. Other objects on display include one of the Daimler-Benz DB 601 engines from the Messerschmitt Bf 110 flown to Scotland by Rudolf Hess, a Bristol Pegasus engine displayed alongside a Harrier jump jet, a Rolls-Royce Avon turbojet displayed next to a Lightning. There is a display of air-to-air weapons, including an M1918 Savage-Lewis machine gun, a Browning 0.303 inch machine gun, a Hispano-Suiza 20mm cannon, an AIM-7 Sparrow air-to-air missile, and air-to-ground weapons including a flechette, a Target indicator and a Fritz X guided bomb.

Hangar 3: Civil Aviation
Aircraft on display include many with Scottish connections, such as the Twin Pioneer built by Scottish Aviation at Prestwick, a Britten-Norman Islander in the colours of the Scottish Air Ambulance Service and a Druine Turbulent built in a house in Airdrie.

Hangar 4: Concorde
This is the main display hangar and contains "The Concorde Experience" and "The Jet Age" exhibitions. "The Concorde Experience" includes a walk-through and around the aircraft (with an accompanying audio guide available), an audio-visual presentation about the history of G-BOAA, and an exhibition about the history of Concorde with prototype and production Rolls-Royce/Snecma Olympus 593 engines, aircraft seats and numerous small objects. "The Jet Age" includes a stack of engines, showing the development of the jet engine and how this drove the growth of commercial aviation. The engines displayed here are a de Havilland Ghost turbojet, a Rolls-Royce Avon turbojet, a Rolls-Royce Conway turbofan, a Rolls-Royce Spey turbofan, a Rolls-Royce RB211 turbofan and a General Electric CF6 turbofan.

Other exhibitions
Additional permanent exhibitions were opened in recent years in other wartime buildings on the site, with a hands-on interactive gallery about flight called "Fantastic Flight" and another dealing with the history of the site called "Fortunes of War". There is also a restored parachute packing building, called "The Parachute Store". Other buildings house various exhibits including a Green Goddess, and an AEC Matador used by the RAF in Malta.

Events

The museum holds an annual air show every July, usually on the third Saturday of the month. The airshow on 25 July 2015 was the eighteenth to be held. Other events are run throughout the year. These include Wartime Experience held in May and Wheels and Wings, a transport event held in September.

See also
List of aerospace museums

References

External links

 
 National Museum of Flight Flickr page

Museums established in 1975
1975 establishments in Scotland
Aerospace museums in Scotland
Flight
Buildings and structures in East Lothian
Science museums in Scotland
Museums in East Lothian
Military and war museums in Scotland
Scheduled monuments in Scotland
Category B listed buildings in East Lothian
Military aviation museums in the United Kingdom
Listed museum buildings in Scotland